Hemicrepidius morio is a species of click beetle belonging to the family Elateridae.

References

External links
Images of Hemicrepidius morio on BugGuide

Beetles described in 1853
morio